Brandon Vázquez Toledo (born October 14, 1998) is an American professional soccer player who plays as a forward for Major League Soccer club FC Cincinnati and the United States national team.

Club career

Atlanta United
Vázquez signed with Major League Soccer expansion club Atlanta United in December 2016 ahead of their inaugural season.

On April 22, 2017, Vázquez played in his first competitive MLS match, coming on as a substitute against Real Salt Lake and scoring a goal in the final minute of stoppage time.

In his first two seasons with the club, under manager Tata Martino, Vázquez was deployed as a winger rather than his natural position of leading the line as a striker. As a reserve, Vázquez made 21 appearances and scored one goal over those two seasons, culminating with Atlanta winning the MLS Cup title in 2018.

After scoring 4 goals in his previous 2 games, Vázquez earned his first MLS Start on June 26, 2019, in a 2–3 defeat to Toronto FC.

FC Cincinnati
On November 19, 2019, Vázquez was selected by Nashville SC in the 2019 MLS Expansion Draft. He was subsequently traded to FC Cincinnati in exchange for $150,000 in Targeted Allocation Money.

After mainly appearing as a substitute, Vázquez made his breakthrough in the 2022 season and new manager Pat Noonan. Vázquez opened the season as the undisputed starter for the first time in his career. After two poor results, Cincinnati took down Orlando City SC with a 2–1 victory on the strength of his brace. The first goal was a well-taken finish after a perfectly timed cutting run between the centre-backs, the second a redirected header off a cross. The following week, Vázquez registered another brace and added an assist in a 3–1 win over Inter Miami. In the 24th minute, he rose to win a cross, beating the defenders and goalkeeper to the ball. His insurance goal, another header, sealed back-to-back victories for Cincinnati. Brandon Vazquez has already set the record for the most goals in a single season in FC Cincinnati history. On August 3, Vázquez was selected for the 2022 MLS All-Star game as a replacement for striker Valentín Castellanos who was loaned by NYCFC to LaLiga side Girona FC after making the original 2022 roster. Vázquez became the second FC Cincinnati player to ever be selected for an MLS All-Star roster, after attacking-midfielder teammate Luciano Acosta had already been chosen for the 2022 matchup against Liga MX All-Stars.

International career 
Born in the United States, Vázquez was eligible to play for Mexico. He represented the United States at the youth level, but had also been called up by Mexico.

He was part of the United States U17 squad for the 2015 CONCACAF U-17 Championship, playing in four games in the tournament.

Vázquez was then named to the United States squad for the 2015 FIFA U-17 World Cup. He played in two of the three group stage games, scoring against Croatia U17 and Chile U17 as the team finished last in their group and failed to advance from the group stage.

He has also played for the United States at the under-19 and under-20 levels.

Vazquez was called into the US senior national team's January Camp in 2023, which did not tie him to an international side. Vazquez remained uncommitted, stating "nothing has changed [regarding his commitment at the international level]. Last year I was doing everything possible that I could control to give myself the best opportunity to get into the [US] World Cup roster... Unfortunately, it didn’t happen that way, but you have to shake it off and start all over again. That is exactly what I am doing now, start fresh, with a lot of energy and a lot of excitement to be here."  Vázquez made his senior debut and start in an international friendly match against Serbia on January 25, 2023 at BMO Stadium in Los Angeles. He headed the lone US goal of the match via an assist from former club teammate Julian Gressel in the 29th minute of the match.

Career statistics

Club

International

Scores and results list the United States' goal tally first, score column indicates score after each Vazquez's goal.

Honors 
Atlanta United
MLS Cup: 2018
Lamar Hunt US Open Cup: 2019

Individual
MLS All-Star: 2022
MLS Best XI: 2022

References

External links 
 Brandon Vázquez at FC Cincinnati
 
 
 

1998 births
Association football forwards
Atlanta United FC players
Atlanta United 2 players
FC Cincinnati players
American soccer players
United States men's youth international soccer players
American sportspeople of Mexican descent
Sportspeople from Chula Vista, California
Soccer players from California
Living people
Major League Soccer players
USL Championship players
United States men's international soccer players